The Bearhawk 5 is a five-to-six seat American amateur-built aircraft, designed by Bob Barrows and under development by Bearhawk Aircraft. The aircraft is supplied as a kit for amateur construction.

Development
The design was initiated at the request of a friend of Bob Barrows, who was looking for a Barrows Bearhawk, but with greater capacity. Barrows completed the drawings and the builder started construction of the design, until health issues caused him to abandon the project. A year later, Mark Goldberg, president of Avipro/Bearhawk Aircraft, described the incomplete project to Collin Campbell of Bolivar, Missouri, who was looking for a new building project, after having built several Bearhawk designs in the past. Campbell agreed to complete the prototype and it first flew on 3 May 2020. By 21 May 2020 the prototype had completed five hours of test flying.

Design
Based on the Barrows Bearhawk, the new design is  wider, with a cabin  longer and an overall length  longer. The stretched cabin permits the installation of a fifth and sixth seat or additional baggage.

The aircraft fuselage is made from welded steel tubing covered in doped aircraft fabric, with the wings of aluminum construction. The wings are identical to the original Bearhawk design.

The test pilot, Rollie van Dorn, noted, "the Bearhawk Model 5 offered no surprises on takeoff or climb out. With all that power, things happen quickly."

Operational history
By December 2020 one example, the prototype, had been registered in the United States with the Federal Aviation Administration.

In an extensive flight review in December 2020, AVweb writer Paul Dye note of its flight characteristics, "you’re obviously not going to mistake the Bearhawk 5 for a single-seat acrobatic machine, but both roll and pitch forces were surprisingly light for an airplane of this size. Rudder was appropriate and positive, and all three axes were harmonious enough to easily fly the airplane in formation with no prior practice. Of course, when working in formation, nothing is better than an excess of power for rapid acceleration when you need to pull forward (coupled to a constant-speed prop that slows you down quickly when you need to back up in a hurry), and the Bearhawk 5 has plenty of extra power. The three-blade Hartzell does a great job of turning that power into both acceleration and deceleration, so the package works pretty well."

Specifications

References

External links

Homebuilt aircraft
Single-engined tractor aircraft
2020s United States sport aircraft
2020s United States civil utility aircraft